William Morton Curry (12 October 1935 – 20 August 1990) was an English professional footballer who scored 184 goals from 393 appearances in the Football League playing as a centre forward for Newcastle United, Brighton & Hove Albion, Derby County, Mansfield Town and Chesterfield. He played once, and scored, for England's under-23 team.

He was Brighton's top scorer in the 1959–60 season with 26 goals in all competitions, and Mansfield's top scorer in both 1965–66 and 1966–67. He went on to manage Boston Town to the Midland League title in the 1974–75 season, and spent nine years as manager of Sutton Town.

Curry was born in Longbenton, Northumberland, in 1935, and died in Mansfield, Nottinghamshire, in 1990 at the age of 54.

References

1935 births
1990 deaths
People from Longbenton
Footballers from Tyne and Wear
English footballers
England under-23 international footballers
Association football forwards
Newcastle United F.C. players
Brighton & Hove Albion F.C. players
Derby County F.C. players
Mansfield Town F.C. players
Chesterfield F.C. players
Boston Town F.C. players
English Football League players
English football managers
Boston Town F.C. managers
Sutton Town A.F.C. managers